Quercus laeta is an oak species in the white oak section, Quercus section Quercus, in the beech family. It is widespread across much of Mexico from Sinaloa and Nuevo León south as far as Oaxaca.

Description 
The leaves are dark green, thick and leathery, up to 40 cm long with a few shallow teeth along the edges.

References

External links
photo of herbarium specimen collected in Nuevo León in 1992

laeta
Endemic oaks of Mexico
Flora of the Sierra Madre Occidental
Flora of the Sierra Madre Oriental
Flora of the Sierra Madre de Oaxaca
Flora of the Sierra Madre del Sur
Flora of the Trans-Mexican Volcanic Belt
Flora of Los Tuxtlas
Plants described in 1854